Aron Wright (September 30, 1810 – December 15, 1885) was an American physician and educator.  He was the founder and president of Miami Valley College.

Life
Wright was born in Monallan, Adams County, Pennsylvania, September 30, 1810. His parents moved four years later, to Springboro, Warren County, Ohio, where he grew up.

He began the study of medicine with his sister's husband, John T. Plummer, M. D., of Richmond, Indiana, and later spent two years at Yale Medical School, where he graduated in 1836.  After graduation, he practiced for three years in Springboro, but moved to New York City in 1840.

After seventeen years practicing medicine in New York, he returned to Springboro with his family. He there engaged in the care of landed property left to him by his father.

In 1870, Wright and other education-minded Quakers founded in the area of Springboro a manual labor school, Miami Valley College.  The school was notable for admitting both men and women.  Wright served as president for a period of nine years, and contributed financially to the college.  The college closed in 1883, soon after he left.

In 1880 he moved back to New York, where he lived in Brooklyn.  He died there in December 15, 1885.

He was a prominent member of the Society of Friends.  His daughter Mariana Wright Chapman became noted as a Quaker suffragist.

References

External links

1810 births
1885 deaths
People from Adams County, Pennsylvania
Physicians from Ohio
Yale School of Medicine alumni
American Quakers